John David Yeadon (born 1948) is a British artist, and art educator. A practicing artist for over 50 years, he explored issues of politics, sexuality, food, national identity, the grotesque and carnival. In the 1980s his work was provocative with issues relating to male sexuality. An eclectic artist essentially a painter and printmaker, his work has included text, digital images, photography, and he has worked on banner making, theatre design and has collaborated with video artists.

Yeadon's grandmother was the ventriloquist Annie Howarth, who worked under the stage name Josephine Langley. Recurring themes in his paintings since 2010 include his mother and grandmother’s ventriloquist dummies

Yeadon's 1984 exhibition Dirty Tricks at the Herbert Art Gallery and Museum in Coventry, was at the high point of AIDS paranoia and gay ‘blame’, Yeadon’s forthright, radical, critical, ‘in your face’ paintings challenged  preconceptions on sexuality and society. These paradoxes disturbed and offended some Tory councillors.

The Coventry Evening Telegraph declared that it was 'Smut Not Art' in a homophobic editorial rant. However the exhibition increased the attendance at the Herbert by 40%. Works from this exhibition were later that year exhibited at the Pentonville Gallery in London and the British Art Show of 1985. The Arts Council of Britain also bought a version of ‘The Last Chilean Supper’ one of the ‘lavatory wall smut’ paintings so derided in the Coventry Evening Telegraph.

With over 30 one person shows he has exhibited throughout Britain and abroad, including in Portugal and Germany, and his one person shows in Britain including the Royal Festival Hall, Centre for Contemporary Art, Glasgow and Ikon, Birmingham. His group shows included the British Art Show (1985/6) and exhibitions in Germany, Holland, Portugal and Hong Kong.

He set up the Coventry-Dresden Arts Exchange in 2012.

Fat 

Again, Yeadon was criticised by the local media for including tiny images of obese people culled from the Internet in his exhibition on food; these pictures were removed from the exhibition. Fat: The mortality of the eater and the eaten at the Bath Place Community Venture in Leamington Spa in 2010.

Harwell computer 

Yeadon's 9x7ft painting of the Harwell Dekatron WITCH computer, Portrait of a Dead Witch made in 1983, was exhibited at the 1984 at Leicestershire Schools and Colleges show, and subsequently purchased by Newbridge High School, Coalville, Leicestershire. Within two years of that school becoming a private academy school, the painting was sold at auction in 2015 to an undisclosed private buyer.

The National Museum of Computing helped discover the painting on the wall of the Jam Street Cafe Bar in Manchester. Kaldip Bhamber, who has a fine arts degree, was unaware of the painting's provenance when she purchased it. Yeadon has visited the painting at its new location.

The painting was a witty subversive irony on 'computer art'; that is a painting of a computer posing as 'computer art'. After 35 years Yeadon has now painted the Live Witch a second version of this computer, for the 5th anniversary of the rebooted computer which pays homage to this national treasure now residing at The National Museum of Computing, Bletchley Park. In February 2018 the two paintings were brought together for an exhibition on Yeadon's 70th birthday at The National Museum of Computing.

Teaching 

Yeadon has been a visiting lecturer at Slade School of Fine Art and at the Royal College of Art, also Goldsmiths College, Chelsea College of Art, Wimbledon School of Art, Glasgow School of Art and, whilst as a full time Lecturer from 1973–2002, at Coventry University, where he eventually led the MA Fine Art course.

Works 

 The Last Chilean Supper – Arts Council Collection, Southbank Centre
 Modern Art, Disco Drawing – Herbert Art Gallery & Museum

References

External links 

 
 

British artists
Academics of Coventry University
Academics of the Slade School of Fine Art
1948 births
Living people
20th-century British artists
21st-century British artists
Academics of Goldsmiths, University of London
Academics of Chelsea College of Arts
Academics of Wimbledon College of Arts
Academics of the Royal College of Art
Academics of the Glasgow School of Art